The 2021 Caribbean Club Shield was originally to be the fourth edition of the Caribbean Club Shield (also known as the CFU Club Shield), the second-tier annual international club football competition in the Caribbean region, held amongst clubs whose football associations are affiliated with the Caribbean Football Union (CFU), a sub-confederation of CONCACAF.

The tournament was originally scheduled to be played in Curaçao between 23 April and 2 May 2021. However, CONCACAF decided in early April to postpone the tournament due to the COVID-19 pandemic in Curaçao. Eventually the tournament was cancelled, and a number of teams originally set to participate in the 2021 CONCACAF Caribbean Club Shield instead participated in the expanded 2021 CONCACAF Caribbean Club Championship.

The winners of the 2021 CONCACAF Caribbean Club Shield, as long as they fulfill the CONCACAF Regional Club Licensing criteria, would originally play against the fourth place team of the 2021 CONCACAF Caribbean Club Championship in a playoff match to determine the final Caribbean spot to the 2021 CONCACAF League.

Robinhood, having won the title in 2019, were the title holders, since the 2020 edition was cancelled due to the COVID-19 pandemic and the title was not awarded, but did not qualify for the tournament.

Teams

Among the 31 CFU member associations, 27 of them were classified as non-professional leagues and each may enter one team in the CONCACAF Caribbean Club Shield. A total of 14 teams (from 14 associations) entered the 2021 CONCACAF Caribbean Club Shield.

After the cancellation of the 2021 CONCACAF Caribbean Club Shield, 9 of the 14 teams instead participated in the expanded 2021 CONCACAF Caribbean Club Championship (marked in bold). Initially, 11 teams would participate, but Racing Club Aruba (Aruba), South East (Dominica) and Platinum FC (Saint Lucia) withdrew, while Hope International (Saint Vincent and the Grenadines) were added.

Associations which did not enter a team

Notes

Venues
The matches were originally to be played at the Ergilio Hato Stadium and FFK Stadium in Willemstad.

Group stage
The draw for the group stage was held on 26 February 2021, 11:00 EST (UTC−5), at the CONCACAF Headquarters in Miami, United States. The 14 teams were drawn into four groups: two groups of four teams (Groups A–B) and two groups of three teams (Groups C–D). The team from the host association Curaçao, Scherpenheuvel, were allocated to position A1, while the remaining 13 teams were drawn into the other group positions without any seeding.

The winners of each group would advance to the semi-finals.

Tiebreakers
The ranking of teams in each group is determined as follows (Regulations Article 12.3):
Points obtained in all group matches (three points for a win, one for a draw, zero for a loss);
Goal difference in all group matches;
Number of goals scored in all group matches;
Points obtained in the matches played between the teams in question;
Goal difference in the matches played between the teams in question;
Number of goals scored in the matches played between the teams in question;
Fair play points in all group matches (only one deduction could be applied to a player in a single match): 
Drawing of lots.

All times local, AST (UTC−4).

Group A

Group B

Group C

Group D

Knockout stage
In the semi-finals and third place match, a penalty shoot-out would be used to determine the winner if the score was tied after regular time. In the final, extra time would be played if the score was tied after regular time, and a penalty shoot-out would be used to determine the winner If the score was still tied after extra time (Regulations 12.5).

Bracket
The semi-final matchups would be:
SF1: Group A Winners vs. Group B Winners
SF2: Group C Winners vs. Group D Winners
The winners of SF1 and SF2 would play in the final, while the losers of SF1 and SF2 would play in the third place match.

Semi-finals

Third place match

Final
Winners would advance to CONCACAF League playoff against 2021 CONCACAF Caribbean Club Championship fourth-placed team for a place in 2021 CONCACAF League preliminary round, as long as they comply with the minimum CONCACAF Club Licensing requirements for the CONCACAF League.

See also
2021 Caribbean Club Championship
2021 CONCACAF League
2022 CONCACAF Champions League

References

External links
Caribbean Club Shield, CONCACAF.com

2021
2
2021 CONCACAF League
International association football competitions hosted by Curaçao
Association football events cancelled due to the COVID-19 pandemic